Brissopsis caparti is a species of sea urchins of the family Brissidae. Their armour is covered with spines. Brissopsis caparti was first scientifically described in 1959 by Cherbonnier.

References

Animals described in 1959
caparti